The 2013 FIVB Volleyball Men's World Grand Champions Cup was held in Kyoto and Tokyo, Japan from 19 to 24 November 2013.

Qualification

Competition formula
The competition formula of the 2013 Men's World Grand Champions Cup was a single Round-Robin system. Each team played once against each of the five remaining teams. Points were accumulated during the whole tournament, and the final standing was determined by the total points gained.

Squads

Venues

Pool standing procedure
 Match points
 Number of matches won
 Sets ratio
 Points ratio
 Result of the last match between the tied teams

Match won 3–0 or 3–1: 3 match points for the winner, 0 match points for the loser
Match won 3–2: 2 match points for the winner, 1 match point for the loser

Results
All times are Japan Standard Time (UTC+09:00).

|}

Kyoto round

|}

Tokyo round

|}

Final standing

Awards

Most Valuable Player
 Dmitriy Muserskiy
Best Setter
 Bruno Rezende
Best Outside Spikers
 Filippo Lanza
 Dmitriy Ilinikh

Best Middle Blockers
 Maxwell Holt
 Emanuele Birarelli
Best Opposite Spiker
 Wallace de Souza
Best Libero
 Farhad Zarif

References

External links
Official website
Organizer website
Final Standing
Awards
Statistics

2013 Men
FIVB Volleyball Men's World Grand Champions Cup
FIVB Volleyball Men's World Grand Champions Cup
2013 FIVB Volleyball Men's World Grand Champions Cup